Thalour Du Perron was Governor of Plaisance (Placentia), Newfoundland from 1662 to 1664.

See also 

 Governors of Newfoundland
 List of people of Newfoundland and Labrador

External links
Government House The Governorship of Newfoundland and Labrador
 

Perron, Thalour du